The fourth season of the American television drama series Scandal began airing on September 25, 2014, in the United States on ABC and consists of 22 episodes. The season was produced by ABC Studios, in association with ShondaLand Production Company; the showrunner being Shonda Rhimes. On May 7, 2015, ABC announced that Scandal had been renewed for a fifth season.

The season continues the story of Olivia Pope's crisis management firm, Olivia Pope & Associates, and its staff, as well as staff at the White House in Washington D.C. Season four had nine series regulars, all returning from the previous season, out of which six are part of the original cast of eight regulars from the first season. The season aired at Thursday 9:00 pm, a new timeslot from the three previous seasons which aired an hour later on the same night. The new timeslot was made to make room for ShondaLand Production Company's new TV series, How to Get Away with Murder.

Overview
The season focuses on Olivia's return to Washington, D.C., after spending two months relocated to an island off the coast of Zanzibar with Jake, and how her absence has affected the people around her. 

The first half of the season focuses on Jake's arrest for the death of Jerry Grant after Rowan forces Tom to name Jake as the operator. Rowan continues to try to make everyone believe Jake is guilty, which inspires Olivia to find out the truth for herself. After forcing Tom to reveal Rowan as his operator, Fitz, Jake, and Olivia make a plan to arrest Rowan. Unfortunately, the plan fails, causing Rowan to shut down B613 and start eliminating B613 agents. Olivia tries to kill Rowan when she confronts him, but he manages to flee. 

The season also focuses on how Olivia Pope & Associates has been closed, which has led Abby, Huck, and Quinn to seek alternative employment. 

Abby is now the White House Press Secretary, and is struggling with gaining the respect of Cyrus and Fitz, because they choose to demean her by calling her "Red" instead of Abby. Later in the season, Abby finds herself even more stressed by the presence of her abusive ex-husband, who has been nominated for Virginia State Senator. As a result, she enlists Leo Bergen to help ruin his campaign. Huck is working at an electronic shop and is refusing to return to the firm, but he eventually does. In the past two months, he has been watching his estranged family, but his former wife, Kim, has not allowed him to see his son, Javi. However, much to Kim's dismay, Huck and Javi begin to form a friendship by playing video games together. 

Quinn has stayed in contact with both Abby and Huck, in addition to trying to find Olivia. During the first part of the season Quinn works on a case for Olivia's friend Catherine from law school, in which Catherine's daughter was murdered and Catherine's grief-stricken husband committed suicide. The case takes an unexpected twist when Quinn discovers that the killer of Catherine's daughter, Kobiak, has been working with both the head of the RNC, Elizabeth North, and Vice President Andrew Nichols. Their plan is revealed as an attempt to start a war in West Angola. Elizabeth North and Andrew Nichols engineer the kidnapping of Olivia, anticipating that Fitz will do anything to save her. Having predicted correctly, Nichols then successfully convinces Fitz to give the okay to go to war with West Angola.

Mellie struggles with the sudden death of her son, Jerry, at the end of series 3. She finally comes to terms with her loss after finding out that Jerry was murdered due to being deliberately exposed to bacterial meningitis rather than contracting the disease naturally, and she chooses to form an alliance with Elizabeth North. Later, after having an affair with Nichols, Mellie discovers his true nature, when he threatens to tell the press about their affair. 

Cyrus starts sleeping with Michael, a male prostitute, who is in Elizabeth North's pay. After finding out that Michael has been leaking information to Elizabeth, Cyrus calls on Olivia for help. As pictures of Cyrus and Michael are leaked, the couple comes up with a plan to get married as a way of handling the crisis.

While Olivia is being held captive, the team that Nichols hired experiences an internal issue leading to its ringleader being killed by Gus, one of his employees. Gus then opens a blackmarket auction for Olivia, and terrorists and foreign nationals start bidding for her. Olivia manipulates the auction to gain the upper hand over the kidnappers, but is unable to stop the auction and is sold to Russia. Stephen Finch, a former Pope & Associates "gladiator" gone for three seasons, returns to rescue Olivia in Russia, and she is safely brought back to America. Shortly after, Nichols suffers a massive stroke, believed to be caused by a collaborative effort between Mellie and Elizabeth. Olivia is visited by Fitz, but reveals her disgust in his decision to go to war to bring her back and drives him away.

Despite the team's concerns regarding her mental and physical state, Olivia chooses to return to her work, starting with a case of an African-American boy who was shot by a white police officer. The team's further investigation finds out that the white police officer set the entire thing up to look like he shot the boy in self-defense, and he is consequently arrested. 

Meanwhile, Fitz begins looking for a new vice president. He initially decided to have Mellie take the place, but Cyrus speaks up against it. Mellie later pushes for Virginia Senator Susan Ross to be nominated for the position. Fitz then hires Leo Bergen to assist Susan, but Leo consistently puts pressure on Susan, who decides to quit the race. However, after several considerations, Susan is sworn as vice president.

On receiving files from Huck's estranged wife, David talks to Jake and Huck about what he should do with the files. Huck tries to talk to his wife Kim about them, but she manages to convince Huck to testify. After Huck's testimony, David begins investigating the case. Jake tries his best to stop David, only for David to continue pursuing the investigation, getting help from other B613 agents. David ultimately finds out that his  assistant is a B613 agent who has killed other agents as Jake manages to shoot her. 

Olivia Pope & Associates continues to handle more cases, such as those of Susanne Thomas and Marcus Walker. Susanne threatens to reveal secrets about D.C.'s top politicians on her new book; while the team was able to eventually convince her not to do so, Huck suddenly kills her. Marcus Walker is accused of murdering the Mayor's wife, with whom he was having affair. The team eventually discovers that Mayor was in fact responsible for the murder,  framing Marcus for it. The team convinces the Mayor to step down from his position, but Marcus decides to reveal the truth to the media. 

As Susan's seat in the Senate is vacated, Mellie decides to take her place. She enlists Elizabeth to help her in the election campaign. Mellie faces problems in her campaign when her half-sister visits the White House and threatens to reveal her past, but Fitz manages to persuade her not to. Then, former Vice-president Sally Langston raises concerns about Mellie, but Olivia manages to shut her down. Mellie also struggles with initially low ratings in Virginia, and decides to enlist Fitz to help her. Fitz decides to seek advice from Olivia, who also advised him to pick Susan as the new vice-president. 

Fitz begins pushing a bill (later known as the Brandon Bill) following the recent shooting near the White House, but is struggling to get it through Congress. He tries to have the bill pushed as soon as possible, but Susan wants to read the entire bill first before giving her vote. With advice from Susan, Fitz eventually decides to improve the bill. 

Olivia meets a man named Russell at a bar, and has a one-night stand with him. Meanwhile, Rowan begins threatening Olivia when she and the rest of Olivia Pope & Associates, along with David, begin planning to shut down B613. Russell is later revealed as a B613 agent hired by Rowan to get closer to Olivia, and he attempts to kill Jake when Olivia and the rest of the team continue to defy Rowan. Olivia later realizes this, and has Russell tortured by Huck and Quinn, while helping David with the investigation of B613. 

Susan continues to defy the Grant Administration, helping out a female officer who appears to have been raped. She enlists Olivia Pope & Associates to help, and further investigation leads to the revelation that one of the higher officers was responsible for the act. After leaking the video footage, the officer is forced to confess the truth to the media. Mellie then uses the opportunity to raise her ratings, by giving a speech on how the military mishandled the case, showing sympathy for the female officer instead of talking about her son. 

Huck and Quinn managed to torture Russell into revealing information about a secret operation named Foxtail, but he escapes before they found out more information. It is later revealed that the lawyer enlisted by the team for the case hearing is a B613 agent, and that he later helped Russell escape only to be killed by Rowan. Operation Foxtail is later revealed to be centered on Mellie, as Rowan generously offers to finance her campaign. The operation was Rowan's escape plan for the case against B613. 

In the season finale, members of a grand jury gathered by David for the B613 case are killed after the initial hearing. Olivia Pope & Associates and David begin investigating the scene, and realize that Rowan was responsible. He had also blackmailed Mellie into giving the names of the members, causing her to feel responsible. Cyrus later finds out the truth, but decides not to tell Fitz. After seeking advice from Maya, Olivia and Jake decide to reveal B613 to the CIA, but their plan backfires. They later came up with a plan to frame Rowan for embezzlement of the funds at the museum where he is working, and he is imprisoned. Later, Fitz finds out the truth about what Mellie and Cyrus have done, and he orders them to leave the White House. Elizabeth then takes Cyrus' place as the chief of staff. In the last scene, Fitz reunites with Olivia.

Cast and characters

Main

 Kerry Washington as Olivia Pope 
 Scott Foley as Jacob "Jake" Ballard 
 Darby Stanchfield as White House Press Secretary Abigail "Abby" Whelan 
 Katie Lowes as Quinn Perkins 
 Guillermo Díaz as Diego "Huck" Muñoz 
 Jeff Perry as White House Chief of Staff Cyrus Beene 
 Joshua Malina as Attorney General David Rosen 
 Bellamy Young as First Lady Melody "Mellie" Grant 
 Tony Goldwyn as President Fitzgerald "Fitz" Thomas  Grant III

Recurring
 Portia de Rossi as Elizabeth North 
 Joe Morton as Rowan "Eli" Pope 
 Matthew Del Negro as Michael Ambruso 
 George Newbern as Charlie 
 Jon Tenney as Vice President Andrew Nichols 
 Brian Letscher as Tom Larsen 
 Artemis Pebdani as Vice President Susan Ross 
 Brian White as Franklin Russell 
 Erica Shaffer as News Reporter 
 Paul Adelstein as Leo Bergen 
 Jasika Nicole as Kim Muñoz
 Khandi Alexander as Maya Lewis/Marie Wallace 
 Jason Butler Harner as Ian Woods/Ian McLeod 
 Chad Donella as Gus
 Kate Burton as Sally Langston 
 Sharmila Devar as Lauren Wellman 
 Cornelius Smith Jr. as Marcus Walker
 Mackenzie Astin as Noah Baker

Guest stars
 Kelen Coleman as Kate Warner
 Jessica Tuck as Senator Stephanie Vaughn
 Mary McCormack as Lisa Elliot
 Josh Randall as James Elliot
 Sonya Walger as Catherine Winslow
 Mary Mouser as Karen Grant
 Carol Locatell as First Lady Bitsy Cooper
 Brian Benben as Leonard Francis Carnehan
 Michael Trucco as State Senator Charles "Chip" Putney
 Robert Baker as Otto
 Marla Gibbs as Rose
 Henry Ian Cusick as Stephen Finch
 Courtney B. Vance as Clarence Parker
 Jimmy Kimmel as himself
 Lena Dunham as Susanne Thomas
 Emily Bergl as Janet Beene
 Dan Bucatinsky as James Novak
 Lauren Bowles as Harmony
 Glenn Morshower as Admiral John Hawley, Commander, U.S. Fleet Forces Command (USFF)
 Mac Brandt as Captain Weaver, Admiral Hawley's Chief of Staff
 Emily Rios as Ensign Amy Martin, Assistant Communications Officer on the USS Montana
 Dan Byrd as Lieutenant Virgil Plunkett, an inexperienced and inept JAG attorney who is later revealed to be a B613 agent who murdered and then stole the identity of the person of the same name

Production

Development
Scandal was renewed for a fourth season by ABC on May 9, 2014. On May 13, 2014, ABC announced their new schedule, as well as a new time slot for Scandal. The show remained on Thursday night, but it was moved to 9:00 PM E.T. to make room for ShondaLand Production Company's new TV series, How to Get Away with Murder. In August 2014, ABC programmed its entire Thursday primetime lineup with ShondaLand dramas Grey's Anatomy, Scandal and How To Get Away With Murder, then branded the night as "Thank God It's Thursday" (or "TGIT"). This echoes ABC's former TGIF branding of its Friday night family sitcoms and even NBC's Must See TV promotion of formidable Thursday night television hits in the 1990s.

The remaining fall schedule for ABC was announced on October 30, 2014, where it was announced that Scandal would air nine episodes in the fall with the fall finale to air on November 20, 2014, just like the rest of ABC's primetime lineup "TGIT" Grey's Anatomy and How To Get Away with Murder. The remaining 13 episodes aired after the winter break, beginning on January 29, 2015, and ending with the season finale on May 14, 2015. The show was renewed by ABC for a fifth season, on May 7, 2015.

Filming
Production started at the beginning of July, as Rhimes tweeted that the writers were hard at work collaborating ideas and mapping out the fourth season. Scouting for the season began a few days later. The table read for the first episode was on July 24, 2014, and Rhimes revealed the title of the premiere the same day. Filming for the fourth season began on July 28, 2014, and ended on April 28, 2015.

Writing
In an interview with showrunner Shonda Rhimes, she revealed that the fourth season would highlight Darby Stanchfield's character, Abby Whelan. She said "Season 4 is Abby's season. That was by design. A lot of what we know about Abby happens this season." Rhimes also confirmed the speculation about the fate of the character Harrison Wright, who she confirmed was killed. She said that all the people at OPA will cope in different ways to Harrison's death, Olivia the hardest. Rhimes said "It will be very devastating for Abby in a surprising way. You'll see how she's coping with it in a very different way than you would expect." Olivia will deal with her betrayal to everyone she left behind, when she hears about the fate of Harrison. The betrayals changed everyone permanently, and Olivia will have to deal with it. 

Shonda Rhimes stated that the fourth season will focus more on the core characters, as opposed to the third season where more characters were introduced. Rhimes explained why: "Kerry Washington couldn't work 14 hours a day, so we had to tell our story in a different way, and that necessitated other people both picking up the slack in beautiful ways".

Casting

The fourth season had nine roles receiving star billing, with all of them returning from the previous season, eight of which part of the original cast from the first season. Kerry Washington continued her role as protagonist of the series, Olivia Pope, a former White House Director of Communications with her own crisis management firm. Scott Foley played Captain Jake Ballard, who gets falsely arrested for the murder of the President's son. Darby Stanchfield played Abby Whelan, now the White House Press Secretary after quitting Pope & Associates. Katie Lowes acted as Quinn Perkins, and Guillermo Díaz portrayed the character Huck, the troubled tech guy who works for Olivia. Jeff Perry continued to portray Cyrus Beene, the Chief of Staff at the White House, who gets forced to marry a prostitute to avoid a news scandal. Joshua Malina played David Rosen, former U.S. Attorney, now Attorney General. Bellamy Young continued playing First Lady Melody "Mellie" Grant, who struggles with the death of her son and decides to run for senator of Virginia, while Tony Goldwyn portrayed President Fitzgerald "Fitz" Thomas Grant III. 

On April 25, 2014, it was announced that Columbus Short would not return for the fourth season due to personal reasons. In an interview with the show's creator  Shonda Rhimes, she revealed that Short's character Harrison Wright would be killed off. Television host Ellen DeGeneres revealed on Twitter that her wife, Portia de Rossi, was cast in a multiple-episode "top secret arc". 

Several guest stars were announced to be cast. On July 30, 2014, Kelen Coleman was reported to appear in the season four premiere. On August 12, 2014, Mary McCormack and Josh Randall were announced to appear on the show as a couple, which aired as part of the season's second episode. Lost alum Sonya Walger was announced to appear on the show in a recurring role, on August 18, 2014. On August 22, 2014, Entertainment Weekly announced that  Matthew Del Negro will play a recurring role. It was announced that the role of Karen Grant, one of the Grant family's children, would be recast. On September 5, 2014, Mary Mouser was reported to take over the role. The actress Jasika Nicole was announced to return as Huck's estranged wife for the fourth season on October 17, 2014, appearing first in the fifth episode of the season. Stephen Collins announced on Twitter that he would be returning to Scandal for an episode. However, after a news scandal about sexual abuse allegations towards Collins, the actor was cut out of the episode per ABC's request.

Two alums from the Shondaland produced television show Private Practice were announced to appear in the season. Brian Benben was announced on September 16, 2014, to have landed a guest-starring role for the season. Paul Adelstein was announced to return as Leo Bergen on the show in an episode which would air in November.

It was reported on October 21, 2014, that Michael Trucco was cast as Charles Putney, Abby's abusive ex-husband. Information about his character was that he is the youngest son of former Virginia Gov. James Putney and the ex-husband of Abby Whelan after he physically assaulted her in a drunken rage. He will appear in at least one episode of the fourth season. On November 4, 2014, it was announced that Khandi Alexander is going to return as Maya Lewis in the winter finale. Alexander's role was initially meant for only one episode as a guest star, but was upgraded to recurring on November 14, 2014. Jason Butler Harner was cast for the show in a recurring role, and first appeared in the winter premiere, playing Ian Woods. On February 20, 2015, it was reported that comedian Lena Dunham had been cast in an unknown guest role, and will appear in the sixteenth episode. She ultimately portrayed Susanne Thomas, a young woman who writes a scandalous memoir about some of D.C.'s top politicians.

Henry Ian Cusick returned as Stephen Finch after leaving the series after the first season as the character would try and live a normal life with his fiancé Georgia. On March 5, 2015, it was announced that both Kate Burton and Dan Bucatinsky will return playing the characters Sally Langston and James Novak respectively. Both actors appeared in the season's seventeenth episode. Emily Bergl was cast as Cyrus' ex-wife and also appeared in the seventeenth episode. Lauren Bowles was announced to be playing Mellie's half-sister, Harmony. She appeared in the eighteenth episode. After the season finale, it was announced that Portia de Rossi has been promoted to a series regular for the fifth season.

Broadcast
The fourth season began airing September 25, 2014, in the U.S. in a new timeslot as a result of making room for ShondaLand produced show, How to Get Away with Murder. The season premiered at the same time in Canada on City. In the United Kingdom and Ireland, it premiered on Sky Living on January 8, 2015.

Episodes

Reception

Broadcast 
The season premiere returned with universal acclaim from critics, with many commenting the accomplishment the premiere did to rebound the series after the third season, which many called "messy". The fourth-season premiere also scored a series high in Total Viewers with 11.96 million and in Adults 18–49 with a 3.8/11. The review aggregator website Rotten Tomatoes reports a 95% approval rating with an average rating of 8.08/10 based on 20 reviews. The series was its ratings increase from week to week compared to its broadcasting last year. The mid-season premiere "Run" was equaled the series's 2nd-highest-ever rating in adults 18–49. The fourth season saw a decrease in the 18-49 key demographic by 5.4 percent to a 2.9, but an increase in total viewers by .86 percent with an average of 9.19 million viewers.

Michael Brown reference
The series received both praise and criticism for the episode "The Lawn Chair" as it referred to the events in Ferguson, where a black 18-year-old, Michael Brown was fatally shot by Darren Wilson, 28, a white Ferguson policeman. Many praised showrunner Shonda Rhimes for a poignant episode and dialogue that mirrored much of the conversation around the shooting deaths of unarmed black men, whereas many meant it was too soon to air such an episode as it was too emotional and criticized the episode for being unrealistic. 

Joshua Alston from The A.V. Club commented that the episode "came across as condescending wish fulfillment", and criticized the episode for not being emotionally true. Aisha Harris from Slate criticized the episode for being too easily to define as she said "Most cases of this nature are not so easily defined—racism and prejudice are often much more covert than that. If only Scandal had been a bit braver in not making Brandon a saint and Newton such an obvious bad guy, it might have made for the realest episode yet." Sophie Gilbert of The Atlantic praised the episode calling it "a tightly controlled and very deliberate exploration of race, identity, bigotry, and conscience." Rhimes explained on Twitter why the episode was more fictive than real as she said "In the end, we went with showing what fulfilling the dream SHOULD mean. The idea of possibility.  And the despair we feel now." Lauren Hoffman of Cosmopolitan also criticized the unrealistic element in the episode as she said:

{{blockquote|Are there people who will watch the white cop's racist tirade and, because it went unquestioned by any of Scandal'''s characters, determine that his actions were partially warranted? Will some people assume that the bad cops always go to jail, and that justice is always served? Will people turn off the TV and pretend everything's OK?}}

Director Ava DuVernay weighed in on the episode as she commented: "An episode like this isn't easy. Isn't easy to write. Isn't easy to direct. Isn't easy to get on air. I appreciate the effort." Judy Smith, the inspiration for Scandal'' also commented on the episode, saying "Just as a parent protects his child, we all must protect each other."

Ratings

Live + SD ratings

Live + 7-day (DVR) ratings

Awards and nominations

DVD release

References

External links

 
 

2014 American television seasons
2015 American television seasons
Season 4